Rosslyn can refer to:

Places

Africa 
 Rosslyn, Gauteng, South Africa
 Rosslyn Academy, a school in Nairobi, Kenya

Australia 
 Rosslyn, Queensland, a town on the Capricorn Coast in the Shire of Livingstone

Europe 
 Roslin, Midlothian, Scotland
 Rosslyn Chapel
 Rosslyn Tower, a Grade II listed house in Putney, London

North America
 Rosslyn, Virginia, United States
 Rosslyn Station, the Washington Metro station serving Rosslyn
 Rosslyn (Edmonton), a neighborhood in the city of Edmonton, Canada
 Rosslyn, Kentucky, United States
 Rosslyn, Ontario, Canada

Society
 Earl of Rosslyn
 Rosslyn Range, American long jumper

See also 
 Roslin (disambiguation)
 Roslyn (disambiguation)
 Rosslyn Park (disambiguation)